An exopeptidase is any peptidase that catalyzes the cleavage of the terminal (or the penultimate) peptide bond; the process releases a single amino acid, dipeptide or a tripeptide from the peptide chain. Depending on whether the amino acid is released from the amino or the carboxy terminal (N-terminus or C-terminus), an exopeptidase is further classified as an aminopeptidase or a carboxypeptidase, respectively. Thus, an aminopeptidase, an enzyme in the brush border of the small intestine, will cleave a single amino acid from the amino terminal, whereas carboxypeptidase, which is a digestive enzyme present in pancreatic juice, will cleave a single amino acid from the carboxylic end of the peptide.

Some examples of exopeptidases include:
 Carboxypeptidase A - cleaves C-terminal Phe, Tyr, Trp, or Leu
 Carboxypeptidase B - cleaves C-terminal Lys or Arg
 Aminopeptidase - cleaves any N-terminal amino acid
 Prolinase - cleaves N-terminal Pro from dipeptides
 Prolidase - cleaves C-terminal Pro from dipeptides

See also 
 The Proteolysis Map
 Endopeptidase
 Edman degradation
 Dansyl chloride
 Protease

External links

References 

EC 3.4
Enzymes